The Conservative government of the United Kingdom of Great Britain and Ireland that began in 1866 and ended in 1868 was led by Lord Derby in the House of Lords and Benjamin Disraeli in the House of Commons.

History
Lord Derby became Prime Minister for the third time, after the fall of Lord Russell's Liberal government, in 1866. His Chancellor of the Exchequer, Benjamin Disraeli, was instrumental in passing the Second Reform Act in 1867.

After the parliamentary session, which produced the Second Reform Bill, Disraeli's eventual assumption of the leadership of the Conservative Party was all but assured. While he was still opposed by elements of the party's right wing (most notably the Marquess of Salisbury, himself a future Prime Minister), his role in securing the passage of the bill, in particular his showing against William Ewart Gladstone, had won him the adulation of a wide base of the parliamentary party. The only unknown was the health of the Earl of Derby, still very much Prime Minister, Conservative leader, and Disraeli's colleague.

Derby's health, however, had been in decline for some time, and he finally resigned in February and advised Queen Victoria to send for Disraeli. Thus on 27 February 1868 Benjamin Disraeli became Prime Minister of the United Kingdom. He reportedly said of the event later, "I have climbed to the top of the greasy pole."  However, the Conservatives were still a minority in the House of Commons, and the enaction of the Reform Bill required the calling of new election. Disraeli's term as Prime Minister would therefore be fairly short, unless the Conservatives managed to win the general election.

Although all the cabinet posts were at his disposal, Disraeli made only a few changes: he replaced Lord Chelmsford as Lord Chancellor with Lord Cairns, and brought in George Ward Hunt as Chancellor of the Exchequer. Disraeli and Chelmsford had never got on, and in Disraeli's view, Cairns was a far stronger minister.  He also chose the Earl of Malmesbury to succeed Derby as Leader in the House of Lords.

The Irish Church

The principal issue of the 1868 parliamentary session was the Irish Question, manifested this time in the debate over the Anglican Church of Ireland.

Fate
The Conservatives were defeated by the Liberals in the general election of 1868, and the new Liberal leader William Ewart Gladstone formed his first government.

Cabinets

June 1866 – February 1868

Notes
This Cabinet of Derby's is the first for which a complete collection of photographs exists of its members.

Changes
March 1867: Lord Carnarvon, Lord Cranborne, and General Peel resign from the cabinet over the Reform Bill. They are succeeded by the Duke of Buckingham, Sir Stafford Northcote, and Sir John Pakington, respectively. Taking their places were three new members of the cabinet: the Duke of Marlborough, the Duke of Richmond, and Henry Lowry-Corry.
May 1867: Gathorne Hardy replaces Spencer Walpole as Home Secretary. Walpole remains in the cabinet as Minister without Portfolio. Hardy's replacement as President of the Poor Law Board is not in the cabinet.

February 1868 – December 1868

Changes
September 1868: The Earl of Mayo leaves the cabinet to become Viceroy of India. His successor is not in the cabinet.

List of ministers
Cabinet members are listed in bold face.

Notes

References
 
C. Cook and B. Keith, British Historical Facts 1830–1900

British ministries
Government
1860s in the United Kingdom
1866 establishments in the United Kingdom
1868 disestablishments in the United Kingdom
Ministries of Queen Victoria
Ministry 1
Cabinets established in 1866
Cabinets disestablished in 1868